The 2018 LINAFOOT was the 2nd season of the LINAFOOT, the top Chadian league for association football clubs since its establishment in 2015.

Unlike the 1st LINAFOOT edition (in 2015) organised as a full national championship and won by Gazelle FC, this edition was organized under the play-off formula.

The season started on 15 September 2018 and concluded on 7 October 2018. The twelve teams were divided into two groups of six teams. The matches were played at three stadiums: Stade d'Académie de Farcha, Stade Omnisports Idriss Mahamat Ouya and Stade de Paris-Congo. All matches were being played at 03:30 p.m. local time. Elect-Sport FC won their fifth Chadian title. Abou Deco (AS CotonTchad) was the league topscorer with 14 goals; Mbangousoum Éric was voted the best player; Francis Oumar Belonga (Elect-Sport FC) was voted the best coach.

Group stage

Group A

Group B

Knockout stage

Semi-finals
[Oct 2]

Renaissance (N'Djaména) 0-0 Elect Sport             [3-4 pen]

Coton Tchad (N'Djaména) 3-0 Tourbillon

Third place match
[Oct 6]
Renaissance (N'Djaména) 1-2 Tourbillon

Final
[Oct 7, stade Idriss Mohamat Ouya, N'Djaména]

Coton Tchad (N'Djaména) 1-1 Elect Sport             [3-4 pen]

Elect-Sport FC qualified for the 2018–19 CAF Champions League.
AS CotonTchad qualified for the 2018–19 CAF Confederation Cup.

References

External links
Chad 2018, RSSSF.com

Chad
Foo
Football leagues in Chad